10 Endrathukulla is a 2015 Indian Tamil-language road action comedy film written and directed by Vijay Milton and produced by A. R. Murugadoss under the banner A. R. Murugadoss Productions and Fox Star Studios. The film stars Vikram and Samantha Ruth Prabhu. 

Made on a budget of ₹65 crore, principal photography and filming took place in February 2014. The film was slated for a January 2015 release, but it was postponed, due to the release of I (2015). It was released on 21 October 2015, coinciding with the Dusshera festival. Despite receiving mixed reviews, the film was an average success at the box office, grossing 118 crore worldwide. The film was dubbed and released into Hindi as 10 Ka Dum in 2016.

Plot
A driving instructor who refers to himself by various names (such as "James Bond", "Mani Ratnam", or "Sunil Gavaskar", "Sachin Tendulkar) but never reveals his actual name is assigned by a local criminal Das to deliver a woman named Shakeela to Pooran Singh in Mussoorie. Shakeela is an orphan who has failed her driving test 14 times. The driving instructor is constantly irritated by Shakeela's antics during the journey to Mussoorie but soon falls in love with her. At Mussoorie, he learns from Pooran that Shakeela is to be delivered to Daksha Bhai, an upper-caste landlord from an Uttarakhand village. 

The driving instructor delivers Shakeela to Daksha and is invited to stay at his ancestral mansion for a festival. During the stay, he finds out why Shakeela has been delivered to Daksha: Shakeela is the doppelgänger of Daksha Bhai's sister Gadgi Moi, a cruel, merciless upper-caste leader who has been sentenced to death for orchestrating a massacre against the lower-caste people. Daksha Bhai plans to send Shakeela to jail in the place of Gadgi, who has been released on parole to perform the last rites of her dead grandmother. The plan backfires as Shakeela escapes from the police.

In the chaos that ensues, Gadgi breaks her cover and kidnaps Shakeela, planning to kill her in a moving train. The driving instructor manages to rescue Shakeela and kill Gadgi. Distraught at Gadgi's death, Daksha commits suicide by jumping off the train with her body. In the end, the driving instructor and Shakeela, who are now in a relationship, happily drive back to Chennai. During the journey, the driving instructor whispers his real name in Shakeela's ear, to which she reacts in a disgusting manner.

Cast

 Vikram as a driving instructor with several pseudonyms
 Samantha Ruth Prabhu as Shakeela and Gadgi Moi (dual role)
 Pasupathy as Das
 Rahul Dev as Daksha Bhai
 Abhimanyu Singh as Pooran Singh
 Sunil Thapa as Lawyer
 Ramdoss as Driving Instructor's boss
 Sam Anderson as Das's henchman
 Saravana Subbiah as Police Officer
 Ajay as a gang leader in Telangana
 Manobala as Manikandan
 Imman Annachi as Annachi
 T. M. Karthik as Doctor
 Sreethu Krishnan as the driving instructor's sister
 Billy as Billy
 Seetha as ATM
 Pandi as ATM's boyfriend
 Shanthi Mani
 Jay Andhana as a doctor
 Charmy Kaur as item number "Gaana Gaana"
 Sridhar in a special appearance in the song "Vroom Vroom"

Production

Development
Vijay Milton collaborated with Vikram for his next film. Director AR Murugadoss was confirmed to be bankrolling the film along with Fox Star Studios. Initially titled Idam Maari Irangiyavan, the film was later renamed as 10 Endrathukulla. D. Imman was signed on as composer for this film, which the composer confirmed through his official Twitter handle. The movie is supposed to be a road movie, which Behindwoods states was a relatively fresh genre for the Tamil audience.

Casting
Samantha was selected to play a lead role, marking her first collaboration with Vikram. Pasupathy has been roped in to play an important role in the film. In August 2014, Ramdoss of Mundasupatti (2014) fame was added to the cast.

Filming
Scenes involving Vikram and Samantha were shot in Chennai for a week's time, and the team was spotted filming in the MRC Nagar area of Chennai. The film began its first schedule on 26 May 2014. The film's first schedule ran for 7 days covering Hyderabad, Ladakh, Sikkim and many major North Indian cities. A major portion of filming is also done in Nepal, whose location are mainly Bhaktapur. The crew reported that they would shoot in many exotic locations across the globe, but also strictly adhere to a 6 months time frame, when the project will be completed. Furthermore, the team also promised a surprise Hollywood crew in the movie. The second schedule began on 23 June 2014. On 23 July 2014, the second schedule was completed, and the next schedule began subsequently. A song sequence featuring the lead pair was shot in a set erected near DMI College of Engineering near Sriperumbudur in August 2014. In late August 2014, about 3 schedules in were completed in Chennai, In One of the 3 schedules, a scene featuring the lead actress Samantha, actor Vikram in a duck farm near Madha Engg. College was shot, and the fourth schedule was planned to be shot in Pune for close to 20 days, with the schedule including a song sequence as well. The climax of the film was shot in Nepal and the train sequence Cappadocia, Turkey.

In October, Charmme Kaur shot for a nine-minute-long song, which was said to have been designed like a play, with Charmme appearing as a character throughout the song. A set for about two-and-a-half crore rupees had been erected in Pune for the shoot. In September, 80% of the film was complete. One song scene was shot in Sikkim mountains on 29 October 2014. The shoot was done in Sikkim, Bagdogra, Jaipur and Delhi. The film team roped Racer Narain Karthikeyan for the action sequences with the racing car. Samantha said that the film was the toughest character she has played so far, she had also been trained to smoke as part of a scene. On 8 April 2015, the filming part ended at Nepal and post production started. Lee Whittaker was the action director in the film.

Soundtrack 

D. Imman composed the soundtrack, while Anoop Seelin has composed the background score for the film. On an interview with Behindwoods, about working for 10 Endrathukulla, which is a high-octane racy thriller film, Imman said that it gave the opportunity for him to explore racy music since the film was a road thriller.

The soundtrack album features 8 songs composed by D. Imman, featuring a piece of theme music, male and female version of the title track and two karaoke versions of the songs. While all the song lyrics were written by Madhan Karky, Mani Amudhavan penned both the male and female versions of the title track "10 Endrathukulla". Sony Music acquired the audio rights of the film and subsequently for legal purchase as a soundtrack on digital music platform, iTunes.

The first track, "Vroom Vroom," is penned by Madhan Karky, and rendered by Santhosh Hariharan, with backing vocals by D. Imman. The song is termed as a racy bike ride with this eerie number supported well by thumping rhythm and amazing bass guitar. The vocal renders the tune with supreme confidence and mastery. Here is a James Bond from Tamil Nadu musically presented in style by Imman-which happened never before! One will be surprised to find Indian musical instruments like Sitar and Mrudangam effortlessly fusing in this mélange.

The male version of the title track "10 Endrathukulla" is rendered by Vishal Dadlani, with rap portions by Emcee Jesz. Experimentation gets a new dimension further when the sequencing sounds like a motorcycle ride in a convincing manner. Vishal Dadlani's urbane voice is a perfect fit for this contemporary chase genre composition. The live drumming and freaky electric guitars are like a detour to Classic Rock of the 80s, but just when that is assumed, a layer of Hip-Hop chorus arrives from nowhere! Watch out for the mesmerizing electric guitar solo in the first interlude- which defines the soul of the album.

The female version of "10 Endrathukulla" is performed by Vaikom Vijayalakshmi. The raciest track of the album gets a different treatment from the season's favorite vocalist Vaikom Vijayalakshmi. While the first version focused on Classic Rock, this version gives its tribute to Hip-Hop beats, addictive Trance and House mix riffs. A totally new perspective of a trendy track is a brilliant treat for the ears!

The song "Vroom Vroom" was released as a single on 28 August 2015. The tracklist of the film was unveiled on 15 September 2015, through the official Twitter handle of Sony Music South and the entire album was released on 17 September 2015, at the Suryan FM Radio Station, Chennai. The makers also made to launch the jukebox in all streaming platforms on the same day.

Track listing

Reception
The soundtrack album of 10 Endrathukulla, got a mixed reception, while "10 Endrathukulla" and "Vroom Vroom" were quietly praised. Behindwoods rated the album 2.75 out of 5 stars, summarising that "10 Endrathukulla is a fun listen!" Indiaglitz reviewed as "Imman experiments with urbane flavor with ease" and rated the album 2.75 out of 5. Moviecrow rated it as 2.5 out of 5, stating "Imman fails to deliver the completely enjoyable album in this 10 Enrathukulla mainly due to uninspiring tunes, However, Imman's orchestration is considerably engaging throughout the album."

Release
The film was initially expected to be released by January 2015, but citing the release of the Vikram's other film I, 10 Enradhukulla'''s release was pushed to April, which further moved to 21 October 2015, to coincide with the Dusshera festival. The first look was released on 17 April 2015. The film's satellite rights of the film were sold to STAR Vijay. The film was also dubbed and released into Hindi as 10 Ka Dum (2016)( Power of 10).

Reception

Baradwaj Rangan wrote, "With 10 Enradhukulla, Milton has made exactly the kind of movie for which Goli Soda appeared an antidote. The writing is shockingly scattershot, right from the scene that's supposed to set up the story". Deccan Chronicle gave 2 stars out of 5 and wrote, "10 Endrathukulla is a good pathology of current Tamil cinema: you have the decision makers of the filming world deciding that it is best to forego artistic ingenuity in favour of safe and predictable entertainment". The Times of India gave the same rating and wrote, "this film lacks the liveliness and inventiveness that made Goli Soda stand out. Rather the focus seems to have shifted from script to scale – smart writing is traded in for exotic locales, larger-than-life characters, over-the-top action choreography and overall blandness". Rediff gave 2 stars as well and wrote, "10 Endrathukulla is a tedious road film marred by overzealous performances, ordinary music, tacky CGI and poor execution". Sify wrote, "The film has racy action sequences, bubbly romance along with unexpected twists and turns but somewhere the packaging goes haywire. Though everything looks good on paper, Milton has lost things in translation". DNA stated "Vijay Milton has come up with a story that unfortunately doesn't do much for the audience. The movie has a very 1980s feel and look and considering the movies releasing today, this one is outdated" and rated it 2 out of 5. Indiaglitz stated "A jolly ride with a few speed breakers" and rated the film 2.75 out of 5. Behindwoods stated "Not as racy as expected, but a watchable ride" and rated the film 2.5 out of 5.

Box office10 Endrathukulla'' was reported to have collected ₹6.5 crore in India on its first day and almost ₹5 crore in South India alone.

References

External links
 
 

2015 films
2015 action thriller films
Films shot in Sikkim
2010s road movies
2010s Tamil-language films
Films scored by D. Imman
Indian road movies
Indian romantic action films
Films shot in Nepal
Films shot in Chennai
Films shot in Hyderabad, India
Fox Star Studios films
Films shot in Turkey
Films set in Uttarakhand
Films shot in Bhaktapur